Caroline may refer to:

People
Caroline (given name), a feminine given name
 J. C. Caroline (born 1933), American college and National Football League player
 Jordan Caroline (born 1996), American (men's) basketball player

Places

Antarctica
Caroline Bluff, a headland in the South Shetland Islands

Australia
Caroline, South Australia, a locality in the District Council of Grant
Hundred of Caroline, a cadastral sub-unit of the County of Grey in South Australia

Canada
Caroline, Alberta, a village

Kiribati
Caroline Island, an uninhabited coral atoll in the central Pacific

Micronesia
Caroline Islands an archipelago in the western Pacific, northeast of New Guinea
Caroline Plate, a small tectonic plate north of New Guinea

United States
Caroline, New York, a town
Caroline, Ohio, an unincorporated community
Caroline, Wisconsin, an unincorporated census-designated place
Caroline County, Maryland
Caroline County, Virginia
Fort Caroline, the first French colony in what is now the United States
Caroline Church and Cemetery, Setauket, New York

Arts, entertainment, and media

Compositions and songs
"La Caroline" (C. P. E. Bach), a classical solo piano piece by Carl Philipp Emanuel Bach
"Caroline" (Aminé song), 2016
"Caroline" (Status Quo song), 1973
"Caroline" (Concrete Blonde song), 1990
"Caroline" (The Badloves song), 1995
"Caroline" (Kirsty MacColl song), 1995
"Caroline" (Arlo Parks Song), 2020
"Caroline" (MC Solaar song), 1992
"Caroline", a 1964 song by The Fortunes
"Caroline", a 1974 song by Jefferson Starship from Dragon Fly
"Caroline", a 1987 song by Fleetwood Mac from Tango in the Night
"Caroline", a 2006 song by Chicago from Chicago XXX
"Caroline", a 2017 song by Steve Martin and the Steep Canyon Rangers

Other arts, entertainment, and media
Caroline? (1990), a made-for-TV film
Caroline, or Change, a musical with lyrics by Tony Kushner
Caroline Records, a record label
Caroline Distribution
Radio Caroline, a UK radio station
caroline (band), a rock band from London, England

Ships
, various ships of the British Royal Navy
Caroline-class cruiser, a Royal Navy class of light cruisers, launched between 1914 and 1915
French frigate Caroline (1806)
French ship Caroline (1785)
, a United States Navy patrol boat in commission from 1917 to 1918
Caroline (ship), several other ships

Other uses
Hurricane Caroline, during the 1975 Atlantic hurricane season
Caroline Street (disambiguation), various streets
Leblanc (automobile manufacturer) Caroline, a sports car
975025 Caroline, an inspection saloon operated in Great Britain, additionally used for VIPs
The Caroline minuscule script, sometimes just "Caroline," also known as the Carolingian minuscule

See also
Carolines on Broadway, an American comedy club
Caroline era, the common historical name for the reign of Charles I of England
Coraline, a novella by Neil Gaiman
Coraline (film), a 2009 film based on the novella
Caroleans, soldiers of Charles XII of Sweden
Karoline (disambiguation)
Sweet Caroline (disambiguation)